The Medicine Tour is the second headlining concert tour by American rock band The Pretty Reckless in support of their debut studio album, Light Me Up (2010), and their second extended play, Hit Me Like a Man EP (2012).

Background
The tour dates were announced on January 23, 2012 via the band's official website. These concerts would be taking place in North America, performing at several of the same venues that the band had visited the previous year.

Opening acts
 The Parlor Mob 
 The Hollywood Kills

Setlist
"Hit Me Like a Man" 
"Since You're Gone" 
"Zombie" 
"Miss Nothing" 
"Just Tonight"
"Goin' Down" 
"Cold Blooded" 
"Seven Nation Army" (White Stripes cover) (performed on Argentina through July 29, 2012)
"Aerials" (System of a Down cover)
"My Medicine" 
"Make Me Wanna Die" 
"Factory Girl"Encore
"Nothing Left to Lose"

Notes
During the band's support shows for Marilyn Manson, The Pretty Reckless performed "Under the Water" before "Factory Girl".
"Nothing Left to Lose" and the cover of System of a Down's "Aerials" were not performed at support shows for Marilyn Manson.
"Factory Girl" contains elements of Led Zeppelin's "Bring It On Home" (April 27 – May 2 and May 4–19 dates only)

Tour dates

Festivals and other miscellaneous performances
This concert was a part of "Hello Cruel World Tour", supporting Marilyn Manson
This concert was a part of "Bazooka Rocks Festival"

Cancellations and rescheduled shows

Box office score data

References

2012 concert tours